Apalapsili Airport  is an airport in Apalapsili, Yalimo Regency, Highland Papua, Indonesia.

References

Airports in Highland Papua